Irving C. Brenner (May 31, 1913 – January 20, 1991) was an American professional basketball player. Brenner played in the National Basketball League for the Pittsburgh Raiders in 1944–45, then for the Youngstown Bears in 1945–46 and one game of 1946–47. He averaged 3.6 points per game for his career.

References

1913 births
1991 deaths
American men's basketball players
Basketball players from Pittsburgh
Centers (basketball)
Duquesne Dukes men's basketball players
Forwards (basketball)
Pittsburgh Raiders players
Youngstown Bears players
People from North Miami Beach, Florida